National Highway 536 (NH 536) is a  National Highway in India.

References

National highways in India
National Highways in Tamil Nadu